Ksenia Anatolyevna Sobchak (BGN/PCGN: Kseniya Anatol'yevna Sobchak, GOST: Ksenija Anatolevna Sobčak, ; born 5 November 1981) is a Russian public figure, TV anchor, journalist, socialite and actress. She is the younger daughter of the first democratically elected mayor of Saint Petersburg, Anatoly Sobchak, and the Russian senator Lyudmila Narusova. Sobchak became known to the wider public as a host of the reality show Dom-2 on the Russian channel TNT. Later she became an anchor at independent television channel Dozhd ("Rain"). As of January 2023, she hosts the television show Dok-Tok with Alexander Gordon.

Sobchak was the Civic Initiative's candidate for the 2018 Russian presidential election. At the age of 36, she became the youngest Russian presidential candidate in history.

Early life and education
Sobchak is the second daughter of the first democratically elected mayor of Saint Petersburg Anatoly Sobchak and Lyudmila Narusova, a Russian politician. Sobchak has described herself as being of part Jewish heritage. Sobchak also revealed that she and her family experienced anti-Semitism.

As a child, Sobchak attended the ballet school attached to the Mariinsky Theatre and the Hermitage Museum art school. In 1998, Sobchak left the school attached to Herzen University, and enrolled at the Saint Petersburg State University (Department of International Relations). In 2001, Sobchak moved to Moscow and enrolled in the International Relations program at the Moscow State Institute of International Relations. In 2002, Sobchak enrolled in a masters program at the department of politics at the same university.

Entertainment career

Television

Sobchak became famous in 2004, as a host of the reality show Dom-2. She left the show in 2012, because the show's lowbrow orientation became incongruent with her political activism.

From 2008 to 2010, Sobchak was a host of the reality shows Who does NOT want to be a millionaire?, Last Hero-6, and Sweet life of a blonde, Muz-TV Awards, and Two stars.

In 2010, Sobchak became a host of the TV program Freedom of Thought on the state-run Channel 5. However, she soon left the program, since, according to her, it turned into a never-ending discussion of public utilities maintenance.

Since 2011, Sobchak has hosted the program Sobchak Live on the independent channel Dozhd (rain) and Top Model po-russki on Muz-TV.

In 2012, she appeared in the television series Brief Guide To A Happy Life.

On 7 September 2012, MTV Russia launched a talk-show GosDep (State Department) with Ksenia Sobchak. The show was supposed to cover hot social and political issues. The first episode of the show, titled "Where is Putin leading us?" featured interviews with the head of Left Front Sergei Udaltsov, member of "Solidarnost" (Solidarity) movement Ilya Yashin, and eco-activist Yevgeniya Chirikova. However, the show was promptly shut down after one episode. The second episode was supposed to feature an interview with anti-corruption blogger Alexei Navalny. MTV Russia representatives explained their decision to cancel the show with the lack of interest in politics among the channel's audience.

As of January 2023, she hosts the television show Dok-Tok with Alexander Gordon.

Film
Sobchak acted in the comedies Hitler Goes Kaput!, Rzhevsky Versus Napoleon, The Best Movie and Entropiya. Sobchak also acted in the film Thieves and Prostitutes.

Music 
In 2007, Sobchak recorded the song 'Dance with me (Потанцуй со мной)' with Russian rapper Timati, as well as a music video. Russian media at the time attributed a relationship between Sobchak and Timati.

Sobchak had earlier posed for the cover of the British band Pulp's This Is Hardcore album. Released in 1998, the album's artwork was produced by the artist John Currin. Asked about the cover, Sobchak said "The shoot was fun. Jarvis is very nice, very shy."

Annual salary 
According to Forbes Magazine, in 2021 Sobchak was the 7th highest paid celebrity in Russia. She has been ranked as high as #4 (2010) and as low as #15 (2016) of Russian celebrities. Her annual salary from her media jobs is around $2.1 million a year. In 2011, her income was $2.8 million a year. In 2017, the main source of this annual revenue is from advertising contracts.

Euroset 
It was reported that Sobchak sold her ownership stake in Euroset for $2.3 million in December 2012.

Other 
Around the time of her interview of Valērijs Kargins in Riga, she and Oksana Robski released the perfume Married to a Millionaire.

On 28 December 2008, Sobchak was on an Aeroflot flight from Moscow to New York City when she and other passengers determined that the pilot was drunk prior to take-off. Sobchak used her socialite status to call Aeroflot representatives and remove the pilot from the cockpit.

In 2009, Russia's Tatler magazine included her in a list of most desirable single women in the country. The list was based on women's fortune and celebrity status. She is known across Russia as a socialite, TV host and presenter. Sobchak was Russia's No.1 "it girl", an analogue to Paris Hilton.

Political background and activities

Background

Sobchak's father, Anatoly, had been both Vladimir Putin's and Dmitry Medvedev's law professor at Leningrad State University. He built a close relationship with Putin, in particular, and in 1991 Anatoly helped launch Putin's career in politics when he was the mayor of Saint Petersburg. Putin then helped Anatoly flee Russia when he was wanted on corruption charges. According to the Moscow News, "Putin's reported affection for the Sobchak family is widely believed to give Ksenia Sobchak a protected status, which may also explain her boldness", such as her encounter in October 2011 with Vasily Yakemenko, the controversial leader of the pro-Kremlin Nashi youth movement, when she reprimanded him for eating at an expensive restaurant in Moscow and published a video of the encounter on the internet.

Russian presidential election, 2018

In September 2017, prior to her announcement to run, Putin said of Sobchak's presidential intentions to a press conference at the 9th BRICS summit, that "Every person has the right to nominate himself in accordance with the law. And Ksenia Sobchak is not an exception here. I respect her father Anatoly Sobchak, I believe that he was an outstanding figure in contemporary Russian history. I'm saying this without a trace of irony. He was very decent, played a big role in my own destiny. But when it comes to running for presidency, things of a personal nature cannot play any significant role. It depends on what program she's offering, if she'll actually run, and how she'll build her presidential campaign".

Sobchak declared her candidacy in the Russian presidential election 2018 on 18 October 2017. Prior to the announcement of her intention to enter the Presidential race in 2018, Sobchak discussed her intention personally with Putin. She said: "With Vladimir Vladimirovich, my family has been associated with a great deal... so I felt it right to say that I made such a decision". Putin, she said, told her that "every person has the right to make their own decisions and must be responsible for them".

Sobchak was the Civic Initiative's candidate for the 2018 Russian presidential election. At the age of 36, she became the youngest Russian presidential candidate in history.

Some skeptics accused Sobchak of being a spoiler to undermine Alexei Navalny; every recent election for the presidency has featured a prominent liberal candidate handpicked by the Kremlin. Other skeptics suspect Sobchak's candidacy is mostly about building her brand. Sobchak did not believe she could win against Putin in 2018, but has stated she's in it for the long haul: "Of course I want to be president, I want to win, but I also want to be sincere. In a system created by Putin, it is only possible for Putin to win. I am realistic about who will become the president."

On 15 March 2018, Sobchak and Dmitry Gudkov announced the creation of a new party, called the Party of Changes on the basis of the party Civic Initiative. The aim was of party was to "return our freedom and your freedom". Sobchak won 1.68% of the vote in the 2018 presidential election.

Flight from Russia

On 26 October 2022, Russian media reported that police had raided Sobchak's home outside Moscow while Sobchak herself had left Russia for Lithuania. The raid came after the arrest of Kirill Sukhanov, a commercial director at Sobchak's media group, "Ostorozhno, Media", for alleged extortion, with Sobchak reportedly being a suspect in the case. Lithuanian border officials said that Sobchak had arrived on an Israeli passport, while Sobchak called the case an attack on her editorial team. Then, days after she fled the country, she returned to Russia, according to state media.

Political views

In 2012, Sobchak was critical of Putin's political policies. Although she stated that she had "happily" voted for Putin when she was younger, she would not do so any longer. In the 2012 Russian presidential election, Sobchak says she voted for Mikhail Prokhorov.

After the parliament elections held on 4 December 2011, which are known for the large number of alleged fraud reports, Sobchak joined the protest rallies held in Russia as a response to the alleged electoral frauds. She also took part in the campaign against Putin's re-election, working as an observer during the president elections held on 4 March 2012. She was one of the Russian protest participants targeted by the Investigative Committee of Russia on 12 June 2012, when her apartment in Moscow was entered and searched.

Economic views 
Sobchak is a supporter of free-market capitalism and privatization. Outlining her economic views, she writes:

Views on feminism 
Sobchak describes herself as a feminist. In her manifesto, she derides the lack of women's representation in industry and politics.

On the status of Crimea 
Ksenia Sobchak is of the opinion that, having annexed Crimea from Ukraine in 2014, Russia violated the 1994 Budapest Memorandum; she claimed on 24 October 2017 that "Under these agreements, we agreed that Crimea is Ukrainian, which is the most important for me". Sobchak stressed that she did not consider the issue with Crimea resolved. "I believe that these things need to be discussed, it is very important to discuss them ... look for some ways out." She also added that "the most important thing that Russia and Ukraine should do now is to restore our friendship at any cost." Simultaneously she suggested to hold a new referendum on the status of Crimea after "a broad and equal campaign." In December 2017, Sobchak claimed that an unconditional withdrawal of Russia from Crimea would lead to a civil war in Russia.

Other views 
Sobchak has said that if she becomes president, she will remove the body of Vladimir Lenin from Red Square, since, in her opinion, this is an indicator of a "medieval way of life in the country... so the corpse of Lenin must be removed from Red Square." Sobchak's proposal has led to wide-spread criticism, with Gennady Zyuganov stating: "It's tragic for the country when Ksenia and the like appear, who do not respect the will of a great country."

In her interview discussion with Julia Volkova in 2021 Sobchak voiced her support for LGBT rights in Russia, stating that she disagrees with the country's controversial "gay propaganda law". On 24 February 2022 Sobchak voiced opposition to the Russian invasion of Ukraine, writing that "We the Russians will be dealing with the consequences of today for many more years".

Personal life
On 1 February 2013 Sobchak married  (born 10 September 1972 in Moscow, RSFSR, USSR). He is an actor, known for Möbius (2013), Bite the Dust (2013) and Dreamfish (2016). Together they have a son named Platon, born 18 November 2016. They divorced in 2018. Sobchak married theatre director Konstantin Bogomolov on 13 September 2019.
They arrived to their wedding ceremony in a hearse.

In 2015 Sobchak said that if there was ever the possibility of political persecution against her, she had thought about emigration or getting an Israeli passport, but would prefer the United States where she could find a Russian-speaking community:

I'm a very big patriot. I really love my job, the city, my friends. And if tomorrow is war, then the place for emigration will have to be a Russian-speaking place. I have to work in Russian.

In April 2022 she received Israeli citizenship.

References

External links

 
 The Guardian: She has a TV show and a Porsche. Now Moscow's Paris Hilton wants a party too
 Candidates for Space Tourists

1981 births
Living people
Mass media people from Saint Petersburg
Russian socialites
Russian television personalities
Russian feminists
Moscow State Institute of International Relations alumni
Saint Petersburg State University alumni
Russian people of Czech descent
Russian people of Polish descent
Russian people of Ukrainian descent
Russian people of Jewish descent
TV Rain
2011–2013 Russian protests
Candidates in the 2018 Russian presidential election
Female candidates for President of Russia
Russian actor-politicians
Jewish Russian actors
21st-century Russian women politicians